Senator Potter

Members of the United States Senate
Charles E. Potter (1916–1979), U.S. Senator from Michigan from 1952 to 1959
Samuel J. Potter (1753–1804), U.S. Senator from Rhode Island from 1803 to 1804

United States state senate members
Calvin Potter (born 1945), Wisconsin State Senate
Emery D. Potter (1804–1896), Ohio State Senate
John M. Potter (1924–1993), Wisconsin State Senate
L. E. Potter (1858–1942), Minnesota Senate
Robert L. D. Potter (1833–1893), Wisconsin State Senate
Tracy Potter (born 1950), North Dakota State Senate
William W. Potter (Michigan politician) (1869–1940), Michigan State Senate

Others
Osbert Potter (born 1956), Senate of the U.S. Virgin Islands